Meroitic Hieroglyphs is a Unicode block formal hieroglyphic containing characters for writing Meroitic Egyptian.

History
The following Unicode-related documents record the purpose and process of defining specific characters in the Meroitic Hieroglyphs block:

References 

Unicode blocks